Luteimonas mephitis is a yellow-pigmented bacterium and the type species of its genus. Its type strain is B1953/27.1T (= DSM 12574T).

References

Further reading
Whitman, William B., et al., eds. Bergey’s Manual® of Systematic Bacteriology. Vol. 2. Springer, 2012.

External links

LPSN
Type strain of Luteimonas mephitis at BacDive -  the Bacterial Diversity Metadatabase

Xanthomonadales
Gram-negative bacteria
Bacteria described in 2000